Brzezinka is a village in the administrative district of Gmina Zabierzów, within Kraków County, Lesser Poland Voivodeship, in southern Poland.

The village has a population of 605.

References

Villages in Kraków County